Sir William Tracy (fl. 1313–1322) was an English Member of Parliament.

He was M.P. for Gloucestershire in 1313 and 1322.

References

13th-century births
14th-century deaths
English MPs 1313
People from Gloucestershire
English MPs 1322